Arttu Seppälä (born 18 March 1987) is a Finnish football player currently playing for VPS Vaasa.

He formerly played for KPV and in the 2009 season on loan for VPS Vaasa from FC Inter Turku.

References

1987 births
Living people
Finnish footballers
FC Inter Turku players
Vaasan Palloseura players
Veikkausliiga players
Association football wingers
People from Lapua
Sportspeople from South Ostrobothnia